Macrocilix is a genus of moths belonging to the subfamily Drepaninae.

Species
 Macrocilix maia (Leech, 1888)
 Macrocilix mysticata (Walker, [1863])
 Macrocilix nongloba H.F. Chu & L.Y. Wang, 1988
 Macrocilix ophrysa H.F. Chu & L.Y. Wang, 1988
 Macrocilix trinotata H.F. Chu & L.Y. Wang, 1988

References

 , 1988: On the Chinese Drepaninae (Lepidoptera: Drepanidae) genera Auzata Walker, 1862 and Macrocilix Butler, 1886. Acta Entomologica Sinica 31 (4): 414–422.

Drepaninae
Drepanidae genera